Top Loader is the debut studio album of Sugarsmack, released on September 28, 1993 through Invisible Records.

Track listing

Personnel 
Adapted from the Hardcore Vanilla liner notes.
Sugarsmack
John Adamian – drums
Chris Chandek – guitar, vocals
Deanna Gonzales – percussion
Hope Nicholls – vocals, saxophone
Aaron Pitkin – bass guitar, organ

Production and design
Kristina Colovic – cover art
Martin Atkins – production
Mark Walk – production

Release history

References

External links 
 

1993 debut albums
Sugarsmack albums
Albums produced by Martin Atkins
Invisible Records albums